Cyperus pernambucensis is a species of sedge that is endemic to north eastern Brazil.

The species was first formally described by the botanist Ernst Gottlieb von Steudel in 1854.

See also
 List of Cyperus species

References

pernambucensis
Plants described in 1854
Taxa named by Ernst Gottlieb von Steudel
Flora of Brazil